Sarvega, Inc., was an Intel-owned company that provided XML appliances.  The Intel purchase was announced on August 17, 2005, and the company brought into Intel's Software and Services Group (SSG).

Other Global 1000 organizations using Sarvega XPE Switches include Fujitsu, health care supplier Mt. Sinai Hospital Systems, Reactivity and Westbridge Technology. Sarvega is also trying to establish a security appliances product for developing and maintaining safety policy and settings.

See also
XML appliance

References

External links
 Intel Press Release
 Intel Software & Services Group

Web services
Enterprise application integration

XML organizations
Intel acquisitions
Defunct software companies of the United States